Infant hercules syndrome may refer to:
 Kocher–Debré–Semelaigne syndrome
 Adrenogenital syndrome
 Myostatin mutation resulting in hypertrophy and increased strength